The B-52 is an American strategic bomber aircraft.

B-52 or B52 may also refer to:
 The B-52's, an American new wave band
 The B-52's (album)
 B52 (New York City bus), a bus line in Brooklyn, New York
 B52 (chess opening), a chess opening based on the Sicilian Defence
 B-52 (cocktail)
 B-52 (hairstyle) or beehive, a hairstyle
 B-52 Memorial Park, a park within the Orlando International Airport, Florida
 Volvo B52 engine, a group of Volvo engines
 Nora B-52, a Serbian self-propelled howitzer
 HLA-B52, an HLA-B serotype
 Bundesstraße 52, a federal highway in Germany
 B52, route number for Kings Highway in Australia
 B-52, a coded reference to Mao Zedong in Project 571